Fazio may refer to:

People
Fazio (surname), list of people and fictional characters with the surname

Other uses
 Fazio (play), an 1818 play by Henry Hart Milman
 Fazio's, American supermarket chain
 Fazio–Londe disease (FLD), motor neuron disease of children and young adults
 Mount Fazio, Tobin Mesa, Victoria Land, Antarctica
 Vic Fazio Yolo Wildlife Area, wetland restoration area in Yolo County, California

See also
 22633 Fazio, a minor planet
 Fazio–Londe disease, a rare genetic motor neuron disease